Rud Ab-e Vosta (also Romanized as Rūd Āb-e Vosţá) is a village in Garmsar Rural District, Jebalbarez-e Jonubi District, Anbarabad County, Kerman Province, Iran. At the 2006 census, its population was 245, in 54 families.

References 

Populated places in Anbarabad County